The Makati OKBet Kings is a professional basketball team currently competing in the  Maharlika Pilipinas Basketball League (MPBL) and the Chooks-to-Go Pilipinas 3x3. The team also competed in Filbasket as the AFP–FSD Makati Cavaliers.

History
The Maharlika Pilipinas Basketball League has announced on April 10, 2018, that the government of Makati will enter a team in the league. The team was initially known as the Makati Skyscrapers but later changed their name to the Makati Super Crunch in November 2018 after it secured a sponsorship with Cebu-based Prifood Corporation, which owns Super Crunch, a snack brand. It was also during this time that the team owners expressed interest in filing an application to join the Philippine Basketball Association.

The team reached the North division finals for the Lakan Cup of the 2019–20 season, however the COVID-19 pandemic caused the suspension of the league. The pandemic also caused a financial crisis within Makati Super Cruch, which led to core players leaving the team. The San Juan Knights advanced to the MPBL Finals at Makati's expense.

In February 2023, gaming company and MPBL sponsor OKBet acquired the franchise of the team.

Current roster

Season-by-season records
Records from the 2022-23 MPBL season:

References

External links
 Makati Skyscrapers Facebook Page

2018 establishments in the Philippines
Basketball teams established in 2018
Maharlika Pilipinas Basketball League teams
Sport in Makati
Sports teams in Metro Manila